The Volvo F84/F85/F86 was a series of medium size trucks produced by Swedish automaker Volvo between 1965 and 1979.

Volvo F84/F85 
Volvo presented the forward control Raske Tiptop with a tilting cab in 1962. When Volvo introduced its "System 8" in 1965 the truck got a new, bigger engine and was renamed F85. Between 1968 and 1974 Volvo offered a budget version called F84 without power steering and with reduced payload.

In 1976 Volvo upgraded the truck and renamed it F85S. The S-version had a bigger engine and a more comfortable cab.

Volvo F86 
In 1964 Volvo had mounted the forward control cab from Raske Tiptop on its Viking model. When Volvo introduced its "System 8" the following year, the truck was renamed F86. The changes, however, were more extensive than that and included a new engine, a new eight-speed gear box and a general updating of most of the components. The F86 was also assembled in Scotland, for sales in the British Isles.

Modernization of the truck in 1973 included a new plastic radiator grille. In 1976 the driver's work place was improved with a more comfortable cab.

Engines

References

External links 

 Volvo Trucks Global - history
 Swedish brass cars - picture gallery

F85
Vehicles introduced in 1965